Amador is a 2010 drama film directed and written by Fernando León de Aranoa starring Magaly Solier and Celso Bugallo.

Plot
Marcela, an immigrant woman with grave economic problems, finds a job as the caretaker of Amador, an old man who can not move from his bed. Day by day, Marcela earns money that she desperately needs while Amador enjoys company that his own family has denied him. Through this, they develop a special connection with each other. However, this connection is prematurely cut when Amador dies. Marcela, desperate to keep her job, finds herself in a difficult moral dilemma.

Cast

Production 
Amador is a Reposado and Mediapro production. Shooting locations included Madrid and Barcelona.

Release 
Distributed by Alta Films, it was theatrically released in Spain on 8 October 2010.

Reception 
Mirito Torreiro of Fotogramas rated the film with 4 out of 5 stars, drawing out Solier's performance as the best thing about the film.

Reviewing for Cinemanía, Carlos Marañón scored 3½ out of 5 stars, considering that Amador "is not going to be his most complete film, nor the most groundbreaking, nor even the most remembered, but this is surely Fernando León's most optimistic film".

Javier Ocaña of El País considered that Fernando León repeats much of the shortcomings of Princesses in Amador, even losing the comedy touch present in Barrio and Mondays in the Sun.

Accolades 

|-
| rowspan = "3" align = "center" | 2011 || rowspan = "2" | 66th CEC Medals || Best Actress || Magaly Solier ||  || rowspan = "2" | 
|-
| Best Supporting Actor || Celso Bugallo || 
|-
| 20th Actors and Actresses Union Awards || Best Film Actress in a Secondary Role || Fanny de Castro ||  || 
|}

References

External links

2010 films
2010 drama films
2010s Spanish-language films
Films directed by Fernando León de Aranoa
Films about immigration to Spain
Films about old age
Spanish drama films
Films shot in Madrid
Films shot in Barcelona
2010s Spanish films